HMS Defence was the lead ship of the  armoured frigates ordered by the Royal Navy in 1859. Upon completion in 1862 she was assigned to the Channel Fleet. The ship was paid off in 1866 to refit and be re-armed and was briefly reassigned to the Channel Fleet when she recommissioned in 1868. Defence had short tours on the North Atlantic and Mediterranean Stations, relieving other ironclads, from 1869 to 1872 before she was refitted again from 1872 to 1874. She became guard ship on the River Shannon when she recommissioned. The ship was transferred to the Channel Fleet again in 1876 and then became guard ship on the River Mersey until 1885. Defence was placed in reserve until 1890 when she was assigned to the mechanical training school in Devonport in 1890. She was renamed Indus when the school adopted that name and served there until sold for scrap in 1935.

Design and description

The Defence-class ironclads were designed as smaller and cheaper versions of the  armoured frigates. This meant that they could not fit the same powerful engines of the Warrior-class ships and were therefore  slower and had far fewer guns. The naval architect Sir Nathaniel Barnaby, a future Constructor of the Navy, considered that in terms of combat a Defence-class ship was worth one quarter of a Warrior.

The ship displaced  and had a ram in the shape of a plough. The hull was subdivided by watertight transverse bulkheads into 92 compartments and had a double bottom underneath the engine and boiler rooms. Defence was  shorter overall and displaced over  less than the Warrior-class ironclads.

Propulsion
The Defence-class ships had one 2-cylinder trunk steam engine made by John Penn and Sons driving a single propeller. Four rectangular boilers provided steam to the engine.

The lower masts and bowsprit were made of iron to withstand the shock of ramming. Defence could make about  under sail and the funnel was semi-retractable to reduce wind resistance while under sail alone. The ship's propeller could be hoisted up into the stern of the ship to reduce drag while under sail. She was re-rigged as a barque from September 1864 to April 1866 before returning to her original ship rig.

Armament
The armament of the Defence-class ships was intended to be 18 smoothbore, muzzle-loading 68-pounder guns, eight on each side on the main deck and one each fore and aft as chase guns on the upper deck, plus four rifled breech-loading 40-pounder guns as saluting guns. This was modified during construction to eight rifled 110-pounder breech-loading guns, ten 68-pounders and four breech-loading  guns. Both breech-loading guns were new designs from Armstrong and much was hoped of them. Six of the 110-pounder guns were installed on the main deck amidships and the other two became chase guns; all of the 68-pounder guns were mounted on the main deck. Firing tests carried out in September 1861 against an armoured target, however, proved that the 110-pounder was inferior to the 68-pounder smoothbore gun in armour penetration and repeated incidents of breech explosions during the Battles for Shimonoseki and the Bombardment of Kagoshima in 1863–1864 caused the navy to begin to withdraw the gun from service shortly afterwards.

All of the guns could fire both solid shot and explosive shells.

Defence was rearmed during her 1867–1868 refit with fourteen 7-inch and two  rifled muzzle-loading guns. The new guns were heavier so fewer could be carried. It was credited with the nominal ability to penetrate  armour.

Armour

The ends of the ship were left entirely unprotected which meant that the steering gear was very vulnerable. They were, however, sub-divided into many watertight compartments to minimize any flooding.

Service
Defence was laid down on 14 December 1859 by the Palmers Shipbuilding and Iron Company in Jarrow. She was launched on 24 April 1861, but ran aground. She was refloated the next day. Her anchor was pushed through her bow below the waterline and she ran aground. She was refloated and taken in to Portsmouth Dockyard for repairs. HMS Defence was commissioned on 4 December 1861 and completed on 12 February 1862. After completion she served in the Channel Fleet until 1866, when she paid off in Plymouth for refit and re-armament. The ship returned to the Channel Fleet in 1868, and in 1869 she was sent to the North America station to relieve . She served with the Mediterranean Fleet from 1871 to 1872 under the command of Captain Nowell Salmon, who had earned the Victoria Cross during the Indian Mutiny in 1857. While recovering items lost when the ironclad  grounded off Pantelleria, Defence damaged her propeller and rudder when she briefly grounded in the trough of a wave, and was nearly blown ashore herself on 24 March 1872. Repairs cost £417. She was paid off again for a lengthy refit in Plymouth between 1872 and 1874 and became the guard ship on the Shannon until 1876. The ship then rejoined the Channel Fleet until 1879 and was transferred with most of that fleet to the Mediterranean while the Mediterranean Fleet patrolled the Dardanelles during the Russo-Turkish War of 1878. Defence replaced her sister ship  as guard ship in the Mersey until 1885, after which she saw no further sea-going service. In 1890 she was converted into a floating workshop at Devonport, and was renamed  in 1898. She was sold for scrap at Devonport in August 1935.

Notes

Footnotes

References
 

 

 

Defence-class ironclads
Ships built on the River Tyne
1861 ships
Victorian-era battleships of the United Kingdom
Maritime incidents in April 1861
Maritime incidents in February 1862
Maritime incidents in March 1872